Sir Dudley Cullum, 3rd Baronet (17 September 1657 – 16 September 1720) was an English Member of Parliament and horticultural author.

Dudley Cullum was the son of Sir Thomas Cullum, Bart., of Badmondesfield, Wickhambrook, Suffolk. He was educated in Bury St Edmunds and at St John's College, Cambridge. He succeeded as third Baronet (of Hastede in Suffolk) on 16 October 1680. He was appointed High Sheriff of Suffolk for 1690 and from 1702 to 1705 was Member of Parliament for Suffolk.

References

 
 https://web.archive.org/web/20180818113510/http://www.leighrayment.com/commons/Scommons6.htm

1657 births
1720 deaths
Alumni of Christ's College, Cambridge
Alumni of St John's College, Cambridge
People from Hawstead
High Sheriffs of Suffolk
Baronets in the Baronetage of England
English MPs 1702–1705